Taigu may refer to:

Former name of Mingxing, Shanxi, China
Taigu County, in Shanxi, China
Ryōkan Taigu (1758–1831), Japanese Zen Buddhist monk